In topology, a branch of mathematics, a nilpotent space, first defined by Emmanuel Dror (1969), is a based topological space X such that
 the fundamental group  is a nilpotent group;

Simply connected spaces and simple spaces are (trivial) examples of nilpotent spaces; other examples are connected loop spaces. The homotopy fiber of any map between nilpotent spaces is a disjoint union of nilpotent spaces. Moreover, the null component of the pointed mapping space , where K is a pointed, finite-dimensional CW complex and X is any pointed space, is a nilpotent space. The odd-dimensional real projective spaces are nilpotent spaces, while the projective plane is not.

A basic theorem about nilpotent spaces states that any  map that induces an integral homology isomorphism between two nilpotent space is a weak homotopy equivalence. For simply connected spaces, this theorem recovers a well-known corollary to the Whitehead and Hurewicz theorems.

Nilpotent spaces are of great interest in rational homotopy theory, because most constructions applicable to simply connected spaces can be extended to nilpotent spaces. The Bousfield–Kan nilpotent completion of a space associates with any connected pointed space X a universal space   through which any map of X to a nilpotent space N factors uniquely up to a contractible space of choices. Often, however,   itself is not nilpotent but only an inverse limit of a tower of nilpotent spaces. This tower, as a pro-space, always models the homology type of the given pointed space X. Nilpotent spaces admit a good arithmetic localization theory in the sense of Bousfield and Kan cited above, and the unstable Adams spectral sequence strongly converges for any such space. 

Let X be a nilpotent space  and let h be a reduced generalized homology theory, such as K-theory. If h(X)=0, then h vanishes on any Postnikov section of X. This follows from a theorem that states that
any such section is X-cellular.

References

Topological spaces